Aarre Merikanto (29 June 1893 – 28 September 1958) was a Finnish composer.

He was born in Helsinki, Grand Duchy of Finland, the son of Elise "Liisa" Häyrynen (1869-1949) and the famous romantic composer, professor Oskar Merikanto (1868-1924). His childhood he spent in Vilppula, Finland. He married Meri Grönmark in 1919. They had two daughters, Anna Marjatta Peltonen (née Merikanto) and Arma Kyllikki Tukia (née Merikanto). He later married Evi Sylvia Mähönen (1910-1968). They had two sons, Ukri Uolevi Merikanto (1950-2010), a sculptor and Pan Ylermi Merikanto (1951-2012). He is considered a key figure in early Finnish modernism (together with Väinö Raitio and Ernest Pingoud) and several of his works, most notably the opera Juha, have obtained posthumous attention. As professor of composition in the Sibelius Academy (1951–1958) Merikanto taught several Finnish composers of the next generation, including Einojuhani Rautavaara, Usko Meriläinen, Aulis Sallinen and Paavo Heininen.

He studied music in Helsinki 1911, Leipzig 1912–1914 and Moscow 1916–1917. Merikanto's early style was rooted in Finnish romanticism, but in the 1920s he developed a personal, atonal but not dodecaphonic Modernist style. The reception of Merikanto's works of this period was mixed: the "Schott" Concerto for nine instruments was awarded in a competition organized by the German publishers Schott & Söhne, but his domestic Finnish audiences and critics were generally unenthusiastic and his opera Juha, today considered one of his major works, was never performed during Merikanto's lifetime. Disappointed with the reactions, starting in the early 1930s, Merikanto gradually abandoned his more radical style and turned towards a more traditional idiom based on Neoclassicism. He also destroyed or mutilated the scores of several works from his earlier style period, some of which were later reconstructed by his last composition student Paavo Heininen. His work was also part of the music event in the art competition at the 1948 Summer Olympics.

Merikanto was diagnosed with lung cancer in the summer 1957, and he died on 28 September the following year, in Helsinki, aged 65.

Main works 

 Juha, opera (1922; premiered in 1963)
 Symphony No. 1 in B minor (1916)
 Symphony No. 2 in A major (1918)
 Symphonic Study (1928)
 Symphony No. 3 (1953)
 Violin Concerto No. 1 (1915)
 Violin Concerto No. 2 (1925)
 Violin Concerto No. 3 (1931; destroyed)
 Violin Concerto No. 4 (1954)
 Piano Concerto No. 1 (1913)
 Piano Concerto No. 2 (1937)
 Piano Concerto No. 3 (1955)
 Cello Concerto No. 1 (1919)
 Konzertstück, for cello and chamber orchestra (1923)
 Cello Concerto No. 2 (1941)
 Lemminkäinen, symphonic poem (1916)
 Pan, symphonic poem (1924)
 Notturno, symphonic poem (1928)
 The Abduction of Kyllikki, symphonic poem (1936)
 Schott Concerto, for violin, clarinet, horn, and string sextet (1925)
 Nonet (1926)
 Fantasia (1923)
 Ten Pieces for Orchestra (1930)
 Olympic Fanfare (1939)
 Song of the City by the Sea, cantata (1949–1950)
 Genesis, cantata (1955)

Chronological list of compositions

References

External links 
 Composer profile on the Finnish Music Information Center
 

1893 births
1958 deaths
Musicians from Helsinki
People from Uusimaa Province (Grand Duchy of Finland)
Pupils of Max Reger
20th-century classical composers
Finnish classical composers
Deaths from lung cancer
Finnish male classical composers
Finnish opera composers
Male opera composers
Burials at Hietaniemi Cemetery
20th-century male musicians
Olympic competitors in art competitions
20th-century Finnish composers